The El-Hakaneia palace at Manshieh Square in Alexandria is the seat of the Mixed Tribunals and it is still used as a court. The court building "Mixed Tribunals" was designed by Alfonso Maniscalco in the Beaux-Arts tradition in 1887.

References

 Mohamed F. Awad:Italy in Alexandria: influences on the built environment. Alexandria preservation trust, Alexandria 2008, S.113

Palaces in Alexandria
Government buildings completed in 1887
Courthouses
Government buildings in Egypt
19th-century architecture in Egypt